Momigami is a Japanese papermaking method, often described as kneaded paper.

Konnyaku starch is used to strengthen kozo (paper mulberry) paper, which acquires an appearance of leather, then said paper is crumpled to achieve a high degree of flexibility.

Japanese artist Sadao Watanabe has made prints of Biblical themes on momigami paper.

References

Papermaking